Rulers of Mitanni - List of kings of Mittani from the 16th to the 13th century BC.

List

All dates must be taken with caution since they are worked out only by comparison with the chronology of other ancient Near Eastern nations.

Mitanni
Mitanni